Jean Marc Ndjofang (born 15 March 1976 in Ebolowa) is a Cameroonian draughts player, resident since 2002 in the Netherlands. He was African champion in 2000 and 2010. In 2011 at the Draughts World Championship he took  third place. In 2013 he placed second at the Draughts World Championship. In 2015 he played the World Draughts Championship match with Alexander Georgiev from Russia.

In 2017 Jean Marc Ndjofang became World Draughts Championship blitz.

References

External links
 GMI N'Diaga Samb
 Profile at site KNDB
 Profile at site FMJD

Cameroonian draughts players
1976 births
People from Ebolowa
Living people